In mathematics, a function

is supermodular if

If −f is supermodular then f is called submodular, and if the inequality is changed to an equality the function is modular.

If f is twice continuously differentiable, then supermodularity is equivalent to the condition

Supermodularity in economics and game theory
The concept of supermodularity is used in the social sciences to analyze how one agent's decision affects the incentives of others.

Consider a symmetric game with a smooth payoff function  defined over actions  of two or more players . Suppose the action space is continuous; for simplicity, suppose each action is chosen from an interval: . In this context, supermodularity of  implies that an increase in player 's choice  increases the marginal payoff  of action  for all other players . That is, if any player  chooses a higher , all other players  have an incentive to raise their choices  too. Following the terminology of Bulow, Geanakoplos, and Klemperer (1985), economists call this situation strategic complementarity, because players' strategies are complements to each other. This is the basic property underlying examples of multiple equilibria in coordination games.

An increase in  lowers the marginal payoff to all other player's choices , so strategies are substitutes. That is, if  chooses a higher , other players have an incentive to pick a lower .

For example, Bulow et al. consider the interactions of many imperfectly competitive firms. When an increase in output by one firm raises the marginal revenues of the other firms, production decisions are strategic complements. When an increase in output by one firm lowers the marginal revenues of the other firms, production decisions are strategic substitutes.

A supermodular utility function is often related to complementary goods. However, this view is disputed.

Submodular functions of subsets
Supermodularity and submodularity are also defined for functions defined over subsets of a larger set.  Intuitively, a submodular function over the subsets demonstrates "diminishing returns".  There are specialized techniques for optimizing submodular functions.

Let S be a finite set. For supermodularity, the inequality is reversed.

The definition of submodularity can equivalently be formulated as

for all subsets A and B of S.

Theory and enumeration algorithms for finding local and global maxima (minima) of submodular (supermodular) functions can be found in B. Goldengorin. European Journal of Operational Research 198(1):102-112, DOI: 10.1016/j.ejor.2008.08.022

See also
 Pseudo-Boolean function
 Topkis's theorem
 Submodular set function
 Superadditive
 Utility functions on indivisible goods

Notes and references

Order theory
Optimization of ordered sets
Generalized convexity
Supermodular functions